Haren-South railway station is a railway station on line 36 of the Belgian railway network, situated in Haren, part of the City of Brussels in the Brussels-Capital Region, Belgium.

Also in Haren, despite its name  to the south-east along Oude Middelweg, is Haren railway station, on line 26.

Train services
The station is served by the following service:

Brussels RER services (S2) Leuven - Brussels - Halle - Braine-le-Comte

References

Railway stations in Brussels
City of Brussels
Railway stations opened in 1866